Xylopia africana is a species of plant in the Annonaceae family. It is found in west-central Africa. It is restricted to submontane and lower montane forests. It is threatened due to habitat loss by clearance of forest. It was first described as Melodorum africanum in 1862 by George Bentham.

Description
The tree Xylopia africana is up to 20 metres tall, DBH 30 cm. It has yellow to yellow-orange flowers. Its seed pods are 6.6-10.5 cm long and contain up to 5 seeds.

Distribution
Xylopia africana grows in montane and submontane mossy forests at elevations of 900–2000 m. It occurs in southeastern Nigeria (Obudu), western Cameroon (Mount Cameroon, Bakossi, Rumpi Hills, Fosimondi, Bali Ngemba), São Tomé and Príncipe (São Tomé Island) and Equatorial Guinea (Bioko island).

References

Further reading
Yvette Harvey, Barthelemy Tchiengue, Martin Cheek, The plants of Lebialem Highlands, (Bechati-Fosimondi-Besali) Cameroon : a conservation checklist, Kew, Richmond, 2010, p. 68 
Daniel Oliver, "Anonaceae", in Flora of Tropical Africa, 1, 1868, p. 30
Jean-Michel Onana, Synopsis des espèces végétales vasculaires endémiques et rares du Cameroun : check-liste pour la gestion durable et la conservation de la biodiversité [Synopsis on Endemic and Rare Vascular Species of Cameroon], Yaoundé, Ministère de la Recherche scientifique et de l'Innovation, coll. « Flore du Cameroun » (no 40), 2013, p. 71
Jean-Michel Onana, Martin Cheek, "Xylopia africana", Red Data Book of the Flowering Plants of Cameroon: IUCN Global Assessments, Royal Botanic Gardens, Kew, 2011, p. 82-83 

africana
Flora of Bioko
Flora of Cameroon
Flora of Nigeria
Flora of São Tomé Island
Vulnerable flora of Africa
Plants described in 1862
Taxonomy articles created by Polbot
Taxa named by Daniel Oliver
Taxa named by George Bentham